Edward Woolridge (December 3, 1903 – October 1976) was an American Negro league infielder in the 1920s.

Early life and career
A native of Anderson, South Carolina, Woolridge excelled at both baseball and football at Tuskegee University, graduating in 1929. He made his Negro leagues debut in 1926 with the Cleveland Elites of the Negro National League.

Notes

References

External links
 and Seamheads

1903 births
1976 deaths
Cleveland Elites players
Cleveland Tigers (baseball) players
Tuskegee Institute alumni
20th-century African-American sportspeople
Baseball infielders